Zachry Dean Callison (born October 23, 1997) is an American actor and singer. He is primarily known as the titular voice of Cartoon Network's Steven Universe, and its follow-ups Steven Universe: The Movie and Steven Universe Future.

Career 
Callison began acting on television in 2009, with a recurring role on Diary of a Single Mom. For the next few years, he had a variety of one-off television roles. In 2013, he was cast in the main voice role of Prince James on Sofia the First, and in the lead voice role of Steven Universe. He is also known for his role as Billy from I'm in the Band and additional voices from Kinect Disneyland Adventures. He voiced King Tut in Mr. Peabody & Sherman, Young Jiro in The Wind Rises, and Billy Batson in the direct-to-video movies Superman/Shazam!: The Return of Black Adam and Justice League: War.

In January 2018, Callison released his debut single, "War!", followed by the singles "Curtain Call" and "She Don't Know". In August 2018, he released his debut EP, A Picture Perfect Hollywood Heartbreak. The EP is a concept album about celebrity life and mental illness revolving around the protagonist's breakup with a mysterious woman named Juanita, as well as his thoughts of suicide and substance abuse. Callison detailed his inspiration behind the album, saying "It's also a commentary on a lot of young actors and artists who have lost the battle; there's been a lot of dead 20 and 21-year-olds in the industry this year, some of whom I knew or admired. I don't know how we fix the problem, but I needed to say something." Also in 2018, he starred in singer/songwriter Nathan Sharp's music video for the song "Phantom" playing the role of a magician who learned the wrong spells.

Personal life 
Callison is also a singer and can play the piano. Callison is a youth representative for the Sea Shepherd Conservation Society. Callison frequents anime and cartoon conventions as a guest, such as Florida Supercon and Holiday Matsuri. He graduated from Oak Park High School in Oak Park, California on June 11, 2015.

Filmography

Live action

Animation

Discography

EPs

Soundtrack albums

Singles

Awards and nominations 

Callison was nominated for "Best Performance in a Voice-Over Role (Television) – Young Actor" category in the 34th Young Artist Awards which he shared with Jake Sim. He was also nominated in the "Best Performance in a Feature Film – Supporting Young Actor" for his role in "Rock Jocks". In 2012, he was nominated in the "Best Performance in a TV Series – Guest Starring Young Actor 11-13" for his role in Disney's I'm in the Band.

Notes

References

External links 
 
 

1997 births
Living people
American child singers
American male child actors
American male film actors
American male television actors
American male voice actors
Male actors from St. Louis
21st-century American male actors
21st-century American male singers
21st-century American singers
American alternative rock musicians
American pop rock singers
Rap rock musicians